George Crabb may refer to:

 George Whitfield Crabb (1804–1846), U.S. Representative from Alabama
 George Crabb (writer) (1778–1851), English legal and miscellaneous writer